

List of Ambassadors

Jonathan Peled (Non-Resident, Mexico City) 2015 - 
Oren Bar-El (Non-Resident, San Salvador) 2015 - 2018
Shmulik Arie Bass (Non-Resident, San Salvador) 2011 - 2014
Mattanya Cohen (Non-Resident, San Salvador) 2007 - 2011
Tsuriel Raphael (Non-Resident, San Salvador) 2006 - 2007
Jonathan Peled (Non-Resident, San Salvador) 2004 - 2006
Yosef Livne (Non-Resident, San Salvador) 2001 - 2004
Aryeh Zur (Non-Resident, San Salvador) 1998 - 2001
Yosef Livne (Non-Resident, San Salvador) 1993 - 1997
David Cohen (diplomat) (Non-Resident, San Salvador) 1990 - 1993
Baruch Gilad (Non-Resident, San Salvador) 1988 - 1990
Zak Deckel (Non-Resident, San Salvador) 1974 - 1978

References 

Belize
Israel